There appear to be two Roffe families of engravers in London, England in the 18th and 19th centuries.

John and Richard Roffe
John Roffe (1769 London, England – 14 December 1850 Upper Holloway, Middlesex, England) was a noted architectural engraver who often worked with a Richard Roffe. It is thought that Richard was the brother of John. Their parents, are Thomas Roffe 1725-1794 and Mary Field Alcock 1735 - 1795
Robert Cabbell Roffe
1780–1839
Birth 6 APR 1780 • Bermondsey St Mary Magdalene, England
Death 25 MAR 1839 • St Pancras, Middlesex, England
John Roffe had been an apprentice to James Basire.

Richard Roffe (1781 – 5 March 1846 in St Pancras, Middlesex, England)

Robert Cabbell Roffe and children
Robert Cabbell Roffe (6 April 1780 Bermondsey, London, England to 25 March 1839 St Pancras, London, England) was an English engraver and diarist. He was apprenticed from 15 April 1794 – 15 Apr 1801 to Benjamin Smith, engraver.

He was the father of:

Alfred Thomas Roffe (22 Apr 1803 Somers Town, Middlesex, England – April 1871 St Pancras, Middlesex, England)

Felix Robert Roffe (1814 St Pancras, Middlesex, England – 27 Jun 1887 St Pancras, Middlesex, England)

Edwin Roffe (19 Sep 1825 Somers Town, St Pancras, London, England – 1891 Islington, London, England)

He was also the father of Charlotte Edwin Searcy née Roffe, who with William Searcy were the parents of Alfred Searcy and Arthur Searcy, South Australian public servants.

References

External links
National Portrait Gallery 'R'

18th-century engravers
19th-century engravers
Portrait engravers
Artists from London